Felimare gofasi is a species of colourful sea slug or dorid nudibranch, a marine gastropod mollusc in the family Chromodorididae.

Distribution 
This species was described from Santa Maria, Luanda, Angola in the Atlantic Ocean.

References

Endemic fauna of Angola
Chromodorididae
Gastropods described in 1996